The enzyme sulfinoalanine decarboxylase catalyzes the chemical reaction

3-sulfino-L-alanine  hypotaurine + CO2

Hence, this enzyme has one substrate, 3-sulfino-L-alanine (also known as Cysteine sulfinic acid), and two products, hypotaurine and CO2.

This enzyme belongs to the family of lyases, specifically the carboxy-lyases, which cleave carbon-carbon bonds.  The systematic name of this enzyme class is 3-sulfino-L-alanine carboxy-lyase (hypotaurine-forming). Other names in common use include cysteine-sulfinate decarboxylase, L-cysteinesulfinic acid decarboxylase, cysteine-sulfinate decarboxylase, CADCase/CSADCase, CSAD, cysteic decarboxylase, cysteinesulfinic acid decarboxylase, cysteinesulfinate decarboxylase, sulfoalanine decarboxylase, and 3-sulfino-L-alanine carboxy-lyase.  This enzyme participates in taurine metabolism.  It employs one cofactor, pyridoxal phosphate.

Structural studies

As of late 2007, only one structure has been solved for this class of enzymes, with the PDB accession code .

References

 
 

EC 4.1.1
Pyridoxal phosphate enzymes
Enzymes of known structure